Dera or DERA may refer to:

Businesses and organisations
 Defence Evaluation and Research Agency, part of the UK Ministry of Defence 1995–2001
 Downtown Eastside Residents Association in Vancouver, British Columbia, Canada 1973–2010
 Dera (organization), a socio-religious organization in northern India

Places

Ethiopia 
 Dera, Ethiopia
 Dera, Amhara (woreda)
 Dera, Oromia

India 
 Dera Gopipur, Himachal Pradesh, known during the British Raj as Dera

Iran 
 Dera, Iran, in Kerman Province
 Dera, Kohgiluyeh and Boyer-Ahmad

Other uses
 dera, a component of some placanames in South Asia
 Dera language, a Senagi language of Papua New Guinea and Indonesia
 Kanakuru language, or Dera, in Nigeria
 Charles Dera (born 1978), American pornographic actor
 Defense-Independent ERA, a baseball statistic
 Diesel Emissions Reduction Act, American legislation

See also 
 
 Daraa, a city in Syria
 Deira, an area of post-Roman Britain
 Deira, Dubai, a district in the UAE
 Dera Sacha Sauda, an Indian religious cult